Jordan Shimmell (born 10 October 1988, in Sheboygan, Wisconsin, United States) is an American amateur heavyweight boxer best known for winning the National Golden Gloves and the US Champion at 201 lbs in 2009.

Amateur career
Shimmell started boxing at age eight and won the Michigan Silver Gloves State Championship in 1998, 2000 and 2003. He also won the Michigan Junior Olympics State Championship in 1999, 2000, 2001, 2003, 2004 and 2005. Shimmell won the Great Lakes (Region 5) Junior Olympic Championship in 2003, 2004 and 2005. He advanced to the National Junior Olympics Championships both years he was eligible. He won the bronze medal in the 189 pound division at the 2004 National Junior Olympics Championships. In the 2005 National Junior Olympics Championships, Shimmell won the gold medal in the heavyweight (201 pound) division He defeated the defending National Junior Olympic champion Bear Richardson, the brother of Olympian Rock Allen, by a score of 6–1.  Also as a Junior Olympic division boxer (ages 8–16), He won the National Junior Golden Gloves Championship in 2001, 2003 and 2004.

Seniors
On turning 17, Shimmell began competing in the open-class of USA Boxing (the experienced boxers ages 17–34). In his first open-class tournament, he won the 2006 Michigan State Tournament. A few months later in 2006, he competed in his first Golden Gloves tournament and won the Western Michigan Golden Gloves, the Michigan Golden Gloves.

He was the runner-up in the 2006 National Golden Gloves in the heavyweight (201 pound) division. He lost a 3–2 split decision to the defending champion Eric Fields who was the Golden Boy award winner for the most outstanding boxer of the tournament in both the 2005 and 2006 National Golden Gloves Tournament of Champions.

In the first Midwestern Trials held in Cincinnati, Ohio, in April 2007, Shimmell won the heavyweight (201 pound) championship. He again won the Michigan Golden Gloves tournament in 2007, but an injury hindered him in the 2007 National Golden Gloves Tournament of Champions. In June 2007, at the U.S. Championships, Shimmell lost a 12–11 decision to Quantis Graves, missing the chance to compete in the United States Olympic Trials for the 2008 Olympics. Graves went on to become the runner-up at the United States Olympic Trials.

Shimmell won the 1st World Golden Gloves Tournament of Champions in November 2007. He defeated Jamie Power of Ireland in the semi-finals on a 5–0 unanimous decision and went on to knock out Mike McDonagh of Great Britain in the second round. He won by RSCH-2 and received the Championship belt for the 201-pound division. The World Golden Gloves tournament was held at the Grand Casino in Hinckley, Minnesota.

In 2009, he won both the Golden Gloves and the US championships at the age of 20. In 2010, Shimmell was the National Golden Gloves runner-up losing a very close split decision in the finals. In June 2011, Shimmell returned to the top, winning his 2nd USA Boxing National Championships gold medal in three years (2009 & 2011).

Shimmell won each bout along the way and once again become the #1 amateur heavyweight in the United States by scores of 14–8 (finals), 19–7 (semi-finals), 18–12 (quarter-finals) and 12–5 (preliminaries).

Professional boxing record

|-
|align="center" colspan=9|20 Wins (16 knockouts, 4 decision), 2 Losses (1 decisions, 1 knockout)
|-
| align="center" style="border-style: none none solid solid; background: #e3e3e3"|Result
| align="center" style="border-style: none none solid solid; background: #e3e3e3"|Record
| align="center" style="border-style: none none solid solid; background: #e3e3e3"|Opponent
| align="center" style="border-style: none none solid solid; background: #e3e3e3"|Opponent'srecord
| align="center" style="border-style: none none solid solid; background: #e3e3e3"|Type
| align="center" style="border-style: none none solid solid; background: #e3e3e3"|Round
| align="center" style="border-style: none none solid solid; background: #e3e3e3"|Date
| align="center" style="border-style: none none solid solid; background: #e3e3e3"|Location
| align="center" style="border-style: none none solid solid; background: #e3e3e3"|Notes
|-
|Win
|
|align=left| Kolmarge Harris
|
|TKO
|2
|30/06/2012
|align=left| Holland Civic Center, Holland, Michigan
|align=left|
|-
|Win
|
|align=left| Mario Huffman
|
|TKO
|2
|21/07/2012
|align=left| Lifestyle Pavilion, Columbus, Ohio
|align=left|
|-
|Win
|
|align=left| Robert Feirick
|
|TKO
|1
|17/08/2012
|align=left| Fifth Third Ballpark, Comstock Park, Michigan
|align=left|
|-
|Win
|
|align=left| Joe Stofle
|
|TKO
|2
|27/09/2012
|align=left| Motor City Casino, Detroit, Michigan
|align=left|
|-
|Win
|
|align=left| Travis Fulton
|
|TKO
|2
|27/10/2012
|align=left| Black Bear Casino, Carlton, Minnesota
|align=left|
|-
|Win
|
|align=left| Clinton Boldridge
|
|KO
|2
|10/11/2012
|align=left| Dance Land Ballroom, Davenport, Iowa
|align=left|
|-
|Win
|
|align=left| Lance Gauch
|
|UD
|6
|21/12/2012
|align=left| Grand Plaza Hotel, Toledo, Ohio
|align=left|
|-
|Loss
|
|align=left| Isiah Thomas
|
|UD
|12
|25/07/2015
|align=left| Palms Casino and Resort, Las Vegas, Nevada
|align=left|
|-
|Win
|
|align=left| Willis Lockett
|
|DQ
|
|27/02/2016
|align=left| Walter E. Washington Convention Center, Washington, D.C.
|align=left|
|-
|Loss
|
|align=left| Murat Gassiev
|
|KO
|1
|17/05/2016
|align=left|  Black Bear Casino, Carlton, Minnesota
|align=left|
|}

References

Living people
National Golden Gloves champions
Boxers from Wisconsin
Heavyweight boxers
American male boxers
1988 births
Sportspeople from Sheboygan, Wisconsin